Bear's Den are a British folk rock band from London, formed in 2012. The band consists of Andrew Davie (lead vocals, electric guitar, acoustic guitar) and Kevin Jones (vocals, drums, bass, guitar). Joey Haynes (vocals, banjo, guitar) left the band in early 2016. Since their 2016/2017 Tour in Europe and North America Joey has been replaced by the Dutch artist Christof van der Ven, not as an official member but as a session musician.

Bear's Den have released four studio albums: Islands (2014), Red Earth & Pouring Rain (22 July 2016), So that you might hear me (26 April 2019) and Blue Hours  (13 May 2022). Islands peaked at number forty-nine on the UK Albums Chart. The band has also issued three EPs:  Agape  (2013),  Without/Within  (2013) and  Only Son of the Falling Snow (2019). Their fourth album, Blue Hours, was released on 13 May 2022.

The band has been nominated for several music awards throughout their career, with "Above the Clouds of Pompeii" earning the band a nomination for the Ivor Novello Award for Best Song Musically and Lyrically in 2015. The band received two nominations at the UK Americana Awards in 2016, Artist of the Year and Song of the Year for "Agape".

History

2012–2014: Formation and early years 
The band's first tour in which the band travelled across the US in Volkswagen Campervans with Ben Howard, Nathaniel Rateliff and The Staves, was the subject of a 2014 documentary, "Austin to Boston" by James Marcus Haney, which premiered at the 58th BFI London Film Festival.

Since then the band has toured the US several times, in support of Mumford & Sons and Daughter and as headliners. They also toured the UK supporting Smoke Fairies in 2012 and Australia supporting Matt Corby in October 2013.

In June 2014 the band received the £2,500 Momentum Deezer Award from the PRS for Music Foundation.

2014–2016: Islands 
On 20 October 2014, the band released their debut album Islands on Communion Records, the label founded in 2006 by Bear's Den member Kevin Jones with Ben Lovett of Mumford & Sons and producer Ian Grimble.

The album spent 10 weeks in the UK Official Charts, peaking at No. 49. Islands appears at no. 7 in the first official UK Americana Chart, and at no. 9 in the top selling Americana albums of 2015.

In March 2015 their song "Above the Clouds of Pompeii" was nominated for the Ivor Novello award for "Best Song Musically and Lyrically".

In October 2015 Islands was re-released as a deluxe edition featuring an extra CD of live tracks.

In 2015 the band sold out their extensive UK, Europe and US tours, including London's Roundhouse.  They performed at international festivals including Reading and Leeds, Glastonbury Festival, Lollapalooza, Citadel, Somersault, NOS Alive, BBK, Squamish, Pukkelpop, Lowlands, Bonnaroo and Dockville.

On 4 February 2016, Joey Haynes announced via the band's Facebook that he was leaving the band to spend more time with family and friends.

Bear's Den's first show as a duo was a surprise set at Communion's club night at Notting Hill Arts Club on 3 April 2016. A short tour of European venues followed.

On 14 October 2016, just under 2 years since release date, Islands was certified Silver by the British Phonographic Industry (BPI), in recognition of 60,000 sales.

2016–2019: Red Earth & Pouring Rain 
On 4 April 2016, the band released a trailer in anticipation of their second album. Red Earth & Pouring Rain was released on 22 July. They also announced a tour of Europe for Autumn 2016, including their biggest headline show to date at Brixton Academy.

2019–2020: So That You Might Hear Me 
In January 2019, the band changed their social media design after almost three years and a website was sent to people affiliated to their official page, called "So That You Might Hear Me", the title for their next album. Four days later, it was revealed that the album would be released on 26 April 2019. They also released two singles the next day; "Blankets Of Sorrow" and "Fuel on the Fire". On 4 March they released the third single from the album, "Laurel Wreath". On 12 February 2019, a podcast bearing the album's name was announced. Hosted by Danny Carissimi, it explores a different song on the album in each episode through interviews with Davie and Jones. In August 2019 the band headed off on a Highlands and Islands tour of Scotland taking in the likes of Stornoway, Aviemore, Banchory and Dunkeld. The tour was a stripped back acoustic affair and the band were joined on stage by Christof van der Ven (who also supported) and Marcus Hamblett.

2020–present: Fragments and Blue Hours 
On 26 June 2020, the band posted a snippet of the Fragments version of "Fuel on the Fire", and changed their social media design. Over the next two days, the Fragments versions of "Napoleon" and "When You Break" were teased respectively.

On 1 July 2020, the band announced a studio recording of the Fragments shows they had done with Paul Frith back in 2018. The hope was that Paul’s re-imaginings, his orchestral re-interpretations, would shed new light on some of the band's songs and in turn cause different reactions in the music and stir different emotions in the listener.

On 17 November 2021, "All That You Are", the first single from the band's fourth studio album, Blue Hours was released. This was followed by another track, titled "Spiders", on 19 January 2022. At the same time, the band announced that Blue Hours would be released on 13 May 2022 and be accompanied by a European and North American tour, their first since 2020.

Discography

Studio albums

Extended plays
 EP (2012)
 Agape (2013)
 Without/Within (2013)
 Elysium (2014)
 Only Son of the Falling Snow (2019)
 Christmas, Hopefully (2020)

Singles
 "Agape" (2013)
 "Writing on the Wall" (2013)
 "Above the Clouds of Pompeii" (2014)
 "Think of England" (2015)
 "Auld Wives" (2016)
 "Emeralds" (2016)
 "Dew on the Vine" (2016)
 "Berlin" (2016)
 "Fuel on the Fire" (2019)
 "Blankets of Sorrow" (2019)
 "Laurel Wreath" (2019)
 "Crow" (2019)
 "Only Son of the Falling Snow" (2019)
 "Christmas, Hopefully" (2020)
 "All That You Are" (2021)
 "Spiders" (2022)
 "Blue Hours" (2022)
 "A Good Love, Pt. 2" (2022)
 "Please Don't Hide Yourself Away" (2022)
 "Team" (2022)
 "Stitch In Time" (2022)

Promotional singles
 "Elysium" (2014)

Gallery

References

External links

British folk rock groups
2012 establishments in England
Musical groups established in 2012
Musical groups from London
Dew Process artists